Elections to Sheffield City Council were held on 5 May 1983. One third of the council was up for election.

Election result

This result had the following consequences for the total number of seats on the Council after the elections:

Ward results

References

1983 English local elections
1983
1980s in Sheffield